Penge West railway station is located in Penge, a district of the London Borough of Bromley in south London. The station is operated by London Overground, with Overground and Southern trains serving the station. Thameslink and some Southern services pass through the station.

 station is a short walk away and has services to London Victoria, Bromley South and Orpington.  station is also within walking distance and has more frequent trains to London Bridge.

Penge West station forms part of the new southbound route of the London Overground East London line that opened on 23 May 2010.

Penge West station provides convenient access to The Dinosaur Park via the south gate of the Crystal Palace Park.

History

The original Penge station was opened by the London and Croydon Railway in 1839, probably more for logistical reasons than anything else: the railway crossed the nearby High Street by a level crossing, and the station would have provided a place for trains to wait while the crossing gates were opened for them. The population of Penge was only around 270 at this time, not enough to make the station commercially viable. It was closed in 1841, and the level crossing was converted to a bridge soon afterwards. The entrance to the station was actually on Penge High Street, and not its current position.  Evidence of the original entrances can still be seen in the brickwork on either side of the bridge as the track passes over the road.

By the early 1860s, Penge's population had risen to over 5,000 - more than eighteen times its level just twenty years earlier. There was also a demand for improved transport to the Crystal Palace nearby, so the station was reopened by the London, Brighton and South Coast Railway on 1 July 1863. This was the same day that the London, Chatham and Dover Railway opened its own Penge Lane station on its line to London Victoria. Following the 1923 Grouping of railway companies, the two stations were renamed Penge West, and Penge East by the Southern Railway on 9 July 1923.

A large building on the down platform served as a ticket office and goods office and included the waiting room and Station Master's office. A wide road from the corner of Oakfield Road and Penge High Street provided access to these buildings and sidings which served a coal yard and timber yard on the site of the old brickfield. The sidings were removed, the buildings demolished and the access road closed when the land was sold for the construction of a Homebase store. Since then access to the down platform has been via a footbridge from the up platform. Previously the only passenger access between the two platforms was via Penge High Street.

The 1863 station building serving the Up platform remained in use until April 2005 when it was damaged in a fire set by arsonists. After a period of limited station facilities, reconstruction work commenced in the summer of 2006 and was completed in December that year.

Services

Off-peak, all services at Penge West are operated by London Overground using  EMUs.

The typical off-peak service in trains per hour is:

 4 tph to  via 
 4 tph to 

These services are operated using  EMUs.

Connections
London Buses routes 176, 197 and 227 stop near the station, while the Bromley-bound 354 stops directly outside the station entrance on Anerley Park.

References

External links

 A Penge Walk starting at Penge West station

Railway stations in the London Borough of Bromley
Former London, Brighton and South Coast Railway stations
Railway stations in Great Britain opened in 1839
Railway stations in Great Britain closed in 1841
Railway stations in Great Britain opened in 1863
Railway stations served by London Overground
Railway stations served by Govia Thameslink Railway